Denílson Martins Nascimento (born 4 September 1976), simply known as Denílson, is a Brazilian former professional footballer.

Club career
Born in Salvador, Bahia, Denílson moved abroad at the age of 20. He was, however, limited to reserve team football with both Feyenoord and Paris Saint-Germain FC, and signed with Portuguese club C.F. União de Lamas in January 1998.

After six years in the United Arab Emirates, mainly at the service of Al Shabab (Dubai), and a brief stint in the Liga MX with Club Atlas, Denílson joined South Korea's Daejeon Citizen F.C. initially on a three-month contract, returning later for one 1/2 years. He helped fellow K-League team Pohang Steelers finish third at the 2009 FIFA Club World Cup, scoring four goals in three games.

On 29 December 2009 Denílson signed for FC Bunyodkor in Uzbekistan, partnering Rivaldo at that and his following club, Mogi Mirim Esporte Clube. He continued playing well into his 30s, making his debut in the Série B at the age of 35 with Guarani Futebol Clube.

Honours

Club
Pohang Steelers
Korean FA Cup: 2008
Korean League Cup: 2009
AFC Champions League: 2009

Individual
FIFA Club World Cup: Top Scorer 2009
K-League Best XI: 2009

References

External links
 
 
 
 
 

1976 births
Living people
Sportspeople from Salvador, Bahia
Association football forwards
Brazilian footballers
Campeonato Brasileiro Série B players
Mogi Mirim Esporte Clube players
Guarani FC players
Clube de Regatas Brasil players
Red Bull Brasil players
Associação Atlética Coruripe players
Feyenoord players
Paris Saint-Germain F.C. players
Liga Portugal 2 players
C.F. União de Lamas players
UAE Pro League players
Al Shabab Al Arabi Club Dubai players
Dubai CSC players
Al-Nasr SC (Dubai) players
Liga MX players
Atlas F.C. footballers
K League 1 players
Daejeon Hana Citizen FC players
Pohang Steelers players
FC Bunyodkor players
Khor Fakkan Sports Club players
Brazilian expatriate footballers
Expatriate footballers in the Netherlands
Expatriate footballers in France
Expatriate footballers in Portugal
Expatriate footballers in the United Arab Emirates
Expatriate footballers in Mexico
Expatriate footballers in South Korea
Expatriate footballers in Uzbekistan
Brazilian expatriate sportspeople in the Netherlands
Brazilian expatriate sportspeople in France
Brazilian expatriate sportspeople in Portugal
Brazilian expatriate sportspeople in the United Arab Emirates
Brazilian expatriate sportspeople in Mexico
Brazilian expatriate sportspeople in South Korea
UAE First Division League players